The 55th Filmfare Awards South ceremony honouring the winners and nominees of the best of South Indian cinema in 2007 is an event that was at Jawaharlal Nehru Indoor Stadium, Chennai on 12 July 2008.

Main awards
Winners are listed first, highlighted in boldface.

Kannada cinema

Malayalam cinema

Tamil cinema

Telugu cinema

Technical awards

Special awards

References

General
 Filmfare serves it up, and how!

External links
 
 

Filmfare Awards South
2008 Indian film awards